Paharganj is in Delhi, India.

Paharganj may also refer to:

 Pahar Ganj, Karachi in Karachi, Pakistan
 Paharganj Bo, Pilibhit district, India
 Paharganj, Raebareli district, India
 Paharganj (film), an upcoming Indian mystery drama film